KKXL-FM (92.9 MHz, "XL93") is a radio station broadcasting a Top 40 (CHR) format serving the Grand Forks, North Dakota area. It first began broadcasting in the 1970s as KKDQ.  The station is currently owned by iHeartMedia, Inc. (formerly Clear Channel Communications until September 2014), and competes with Leighton Broadcasting's KZGF "Z94.7".

History

KKXL-FM signed on December 23, 1974, as a counterpart to KKXL (1440 AM). The call letters were KKDQ from June 30, 1975, to July 27, 1981.

KKXL-FM signed on in 1981 in Grand Forks with a Top 40 format. The station rivaled with now co-owned KQHT "Magic 96" during the late 1980s and 1990s, competed with KYTN "Y95" during the late 1980s, the short-lived KZLT-FM "More Music 104.3" during 2006 and 2007, and currently with KZGF "Z94.7".  Famous former DJ's include Rockin' Rick from 1990 to 2017, Mike Danger from 1990 to 1994, Micheal Right & Kevin Hendrickson during the '80s.

Programming
Weekday programming includes "Trevor D. in the Morning", On Air with Ryan Seacrest, Sarah-Ruth on afternoons, RJ on nights, and EJ on overnights.  Notable weekend programming includes Saturday Night Online with Romeo, Open House Party on Sunday nights, Sonrise with Kevin Peterson, Backtrax USA, and American Top 40 with Ryan Seacrest.

References

External links
XL93 official website

KXL-FM
Contemporary hit radio stations in the United States
Radio stations established in 1974
IHeartMedia radio stations